List of cat documentaries, television series and cartoons includes serious documentaries, television series and cartoons, in alphabetical order, related to cats .

Documentaries
 Cats: Caressing the Tiger (1991), National Geographic
 CATS - Choosing, Caring and Training (2008), Revolution LLC
 Kedi (2016), Termite Films
 Science of Cats (2014), National Geographic
 Secret Life of Cats (2014), National Geographic
 The Standard of Perfection: Show Cats (2009), Public Broadcasting Service
 The World of Cats (2008), Columbia River Entertainment
 Understanding Cats (2009), Public Broadcasting Service
 The Lion In Your Living Room (2015), Canadian Broadcasting Company
 Cat Empire: docuseries (2021), Ubique Film

Big cats documentaries
 Lions Of The African Night (1987) National Geographic
 Lions Of Darkness (1993) National Geographic
 Big Cats (2018, 3 episodes), BBC
 Tiger King: Murder, Mayhem and Madness (2020, 7 episodes), Netflix

Television series
 Heathcliff (1980), Ruby-Spears Productions et al.
 Cats 101 (2009-2012), Animal Planet
 My Cat from Hell (2011-2016), Animal Planet
 Must Love Cats (2011-2012), Animal Planet

Cartoons
 Garfield (1978-present), Universal Press Syndicate
 Krazy Kat (1913-1944), King Features Syndicate
 Simon's Cat (2008-present), Simon's Cat Ltd
 The Itchy & Scratchy Show (1988-1997), 20th Television
 Tom and Jerry (1940-1958), Hanna-Barbera
 Top Cat'' (1961-1962), Hanna-Barbera

Films about cats
Cat documentaries
Lists of mass media
Lists of documentaries
Lists of television series
Lists of animated cartoons